Sam Cookson may refer to:

 Sam Cookson (English footballer) (1896–?), English footballer for Manchester City 	
 Sam Cookson (Welsh footballer) (1891–?), Welsh footballer for Manchester United